V373 Cas is a binary star system in the northern constellation Cassiopeia. It is a suspected eclipsing binary with an apparent visual magnitude that decreases from a baseline of 6.03 down to 6.13. The system is located at a distance of approximately 6,200 light years from the Sun, but is drifting closer with a radial velocity of around −25.5 km/s.

The binary nature of this system was announced in 1912 by Walter S. Adams. It is a double-lined spectroscopic binary with an orbital period of 13.4 days and an eccentricity of 0.13. The system was found to be variable in 1958 by C. Roger Lynds, and the variability cycle was shown to be related to the orbital period.  It has been described as a heartbeat star rather than an eclipsing system.  This is a type of pulsating star where the pulsations are induced by the tidal attraction of a close companion.

V373 Cas is composed of two hot blue-white giant stars that have exhausted their core hydrogen and expanded off the main sequence. Lyubimkov and colleagues analysed spectral and radial velocity to calculate that the stars were ~19 and ~15 times as massive as the Sun and the age of the system is around 7-8 million years old. The primary component is the more evolved and now comes close to filling its Roche lobe when it is at periastron.

References

B-type bright giants
B-type giants
Spectroscopic binaries
Eclipsing binaries

Cassiopeia (constellation)
Durchmusterung objects
224151
117957
9052
Cassiopeiae, V373